Night of Bloody Horror is a 1969 American horror film directed by Joy N. Houck Jr. and starring Gerald McRaney in his feature film debut.

Plot 
Wesley Stuart, a mentally fragile youth who lives with his domineering mother, has recently been released from an asylum, where he spent 13 years for accidentally shooting and killing his brother. Plagued by headaches and sudden blackouts, he becomes the chief suspect when some of his recent acquaintances, including his girlfriend and a nurse, are violently murdered.

Cast
Gerald McRaney as Wesley Stuart
Evelyn Hendricks as Agatha Stuart
Gaye Yellen as Angelle Miliot
Herbert Nelson as Dr. Bennett Moss
Lisa Dameron as Susan Collins
Charlotte White as Kay Jensen
Michael Anthony as Mario Spanelli
George Spelvin as Priest

Production
The film was shot in New Orleans.

References

External links
 
 

American horror films
Films shot in Louisiana
Films shot in New Orleans
1960s English-language films
Films directed by Joy N. Houck Jr.
1960s American films